The coronet of Crown prince is one of the Norwegian Royal Regalia.

The coronet was made in 1846, designed by Johannes Flintoe based on a crown dating from the Middle Ages, and commissioned to the goldsmith Herman Colbjørnsen Øyset. It was originally made for Crown Prince Carl of Sweden, future King Charles XV. It was meant to be used by Carl when his parents Oscar I and Josephine were crowned, but the ceremony never took place. It is the only piece of Norway's coronation regalia to be made entirely within Norway, and it has never been worn. It is a crown of the open type with spikes. It weighs a little over 1 kg, and contains a green peridot, freshwater pearls and an amethyst.

See also 
 Regalia of Norway

Literature
 Per Nordenvall: Kungliga Serafimerorden 1748-1998, Borås 1998 pages 550-551

References

Official Site - Page of the Crown.

Individual crowns
Norwegian monarchy